The Queen Charlotte Mountains are a mountain range comprising all mountains and small mountain ranges of Haida Gwaii, British Columbia, Canada. It is the northernmost subrange of the Insular Mountains.  They are subdivided into the Queen Charlotte Ranges, which comprise a small part of southwestern Graham Island and most of Moresby Island, and the Skidegate Plateau, which runs NW-SE on central Graham Island and includes the northeastern tip of Moresby Island.  To the plateau's northeast is the Queen Charlotte Lowland, which is part of the Hecate Depression and includes the Argonaut Plain.

Sub-ranges
Cameron Range: On the western side of Graham Island
Crease Range: On north-central Graham Island
McKay Range: On the south coast of Graham Island
San Christoval Range: On the western side of Moresby Island

See also
Vancouver Island Ranges
Insular Mountains

References

 
Landforms of Haida Gwaii
Insular Mountains
Mountain ranges of British Columbia